Hans Christer Åberg (born April 23, 1964, in Saltsjöbaden, Stockholm County ) is a Swedish evangelist, blogger and author.  He is known for his blog site apg29.nu.

Biography 
Åberg was left by his parents in orphanages. He later came to a foster family where he felt unwelcome and describes his school days as dark himself. At the age of 20, he was "saved" and had a strong experience of being seen by God and has since served as an evangelist. Among other things, he has performed together with the singer-evangelist Nenne Lindberg and his team and has regularly appeared on the channel Himlen TV7.

In 2001, he started the blog site Apg29 which has had more than a million views.  The site has been criticized for anti-Islam content. The site has also attracted attention for criticizing the Roman Catholic Church and The Church of Jesus Christ of Latter-day Saints as well as Jehovah's Witnesses for deed doctrine. 

In 2016, Åberg published his first book, the autobiographical The Longest Night. The book is about how his heavily pregnant wife and newborn son died of amniocentesis in 2008. In 2020, Åberg published his second autobiographical book, The Unwanted, which is about his upbringing.

Family 
Christer Åberg married Marie Åberg (2004–1964) in 9, with whom he had a daughter (born 2006) and a son (born and died 2008).

Bibliography 

 2016 – 
 2020 –

References

External links 

 Apg29 Official webpages

Swedish bloggers
1964 births
Living people
People from Nacka Municipality
Swedish Christians